The 2020–21 Ligat Nashim was the 23rd season of women's league football under the Israeli Football Association. 

The defending champions were Ramat HaSharon.

Ligat al

League table

Liga leumit

References

Ligat Nashim seasons
1
women
Israel